Company Commander is a play-by-mail wargame initially published by Schubel & Son in the 1980s. Jason Oats Games is the current publisher.

Development
Schubel & Son published Company Commander in the 1980s. As of 1991, the company Escape from Reality was at least the third publisher of the game. As of August 2019, Jason Oats Games was the publisher.

The setting for the game has changed over time. In 1986, it was Thailand. In 1991, the setting was Egypt. In 2001, the setting for the game was a fictional country in South America. As of 2022, the current game—version 13—takes place in a country called Malanesia, a combination of the countries of Malaysia and Indonesia.

Gameplay
The game is closed-ended. Players lead a faction in a fictional country. In the 1991 version, players control a squad of ten soldiers battling in Egypt. Gameplay involves management of money, movement, and combat, where players must manage the supporting aspects of forces as well as the combat units.

In the 2002 version, victory was attained by achieving control of five towns in the country, although the game map comprised a few hundred uninhabited villages as well. Towns are divided into sectors and are defended by government forces. According to reviewer Peter Jull, "Your aim in Company Commander is to defeat your rivals in battle, but the logistical and economic aspects of doing so feature heavily in the game."

Reception
Bill Flad reviewed the game in the November–December 1986 issue of Paper Mayhem magazine. He stated that the game was "of unparalleled anticipation and promise, but inevitable disappointment and frustration". He also pointed to the high cost, noting that Schubel & Son even forewarned players of the high expense, and provided examples in 1986 from gameplay where he was charged $21 for being attacked by another player and a friend who spent $65 on a single complicated turn. Phil Chenevert reviewed the game in the September–October 1991 issue of Paper Mayhem, stating that it, "has been around for a long time now, and will continue to be a popular game into the next century because it is well-designed, fun to play and exciting." He noted issues with the game at the time as cost and "gamemaster errors". He summarized that "Company Commander is a fine game for those who like to buy and maneuver small force and smash them into other forces. ... It feels good. I like it."

Notes

See also
 List of play-by-mail games

References

Bibliography
 
 
 
 
 
 
 

Multiplayer games
Play-by-mail games
Wargames
Wargames introduced in the 1980s